Daniel "Dani" Barrio Alvarez (born 10 February 1987) is a Spanish professional footballer who plays as a goalkeeper for Burgos CF.

Club career
Born in Gijón, Asturias, Barrio graduated with Sporting de Gijón's youth setup, and made his senior debuts with the reserves in the 2006–07 campaign, in Tercera División. He first arrived in Segunda División B in 2011, signing for Real Oviedo, after stints with Ribadesella CF and Marino de Luanco, both in the fourth level.

On 11 August 2013 Barrio moved to CD Leganés, also in the third division. He appeared in 31 matches during the season, as the Madrid side were promoted to Segunda División after a ten-year absence.

On 11 September 2014 Barrio made his professional debut, starting in a 1–1 home draw against CD Numancia, for the campaign's Copa del Rey. He made his Segunda División debut on 8 February of the following year, playing the full 90 minutes in a 2–0 away win against RCD Mallorca.

In 2015, Barrio joined UD Melilla in the third division, being an undisputed first-choice during his spell. On 10 July 2019, he signed a one-year contract with CD Numancia in the second level.

On 28 August 2020, after suffering relegation, Barrio agreed to a two-year contract with Málaga CF. After two seasons acting mainly as a backup, he signed a one-year deal with fellow second level side Burgos CF on 30 June 2022.

References

External links

1987 births
Living people
People from Gijón
Spanish footballers
Footballers from Asturias
Association football goalkeepers
Segunda División players
Segunda División B players
Tercera División players
Sporting de Gijón B players
Real Oviedo players
CD Leganés players
UD Melilla footballers
CD Numancia players
Málaga CF players
Burgos CF footballers